Megan Roberts (born November 21, 2000) is a senior elite Canadian artistic gymnast and a member of the Canada National team. She trains at East York Gymnastics, coached by Lawson Hamer and Lisa Cowan.

Novice career

2013 

Roberts made her debut at the Elite Canada, winning every event except beam, on which she placed sixth. At the Canadian Championships that year, she won vault and floor exercise gold, all-around silver, and placed fourth on bars and fifth on beam.

Junior career

2014 

Roberts competed at the Elite Canada in February, placing fourth in the all-around, fifth on bars, and sixth on vault. She was named to the Canadian team for the International Gymnix, her international debut, where she won silver with her team and placed ninth in the all-around. She went on to compete at the Junior Pan American Championships, winning team gold and placing fourth in the all-around and on uneven bars. In April, she competed at the Pacific Rim Championships, winning team silver and placing eighth on beam and eleventh in the all-around.
In May, Roberts competed at the Canadian Championships in Ottawa, winning silver on both the vault and floor, bronze in the all-around, and placing fourth on bars.
In November, she competed at the Elite Gym Massilia in France. In the Open division, she won team and balance beam silver and placed tenth in the all-around. In the Master division, she placed fourth on floor, fifth with her team, sixth on vault, and twenty-fifth in the all-around.

2015 

Roberts competed at the Elite Canada in January, she won gold in the all-arounds. In the Event finals she won gold on bars, floor and vault and bronze on beam.
In February, Roberts competed with Team Ontario at the 2015 Canada Winter Games. She won Silver in the Team Event, Bronze in the All Arounds and was the only gymnast to win more than one final in the women’s event taking Gold on both vault and floor and a silver medal on beam to cap a strong overall performance. In March, Roberts competed with Team Canada at Gymnix International, where they won Gold and she placed fifth in the all-arounds. She also won Silver on both vault and floor in the event finals. Later in March, Roberts competed with Team Canada at the City of Jesolo Trophy where they won Silver. Roberts also won Bronze in the Floor Event finals.

In May, Roberts competed at the Canadian Championships in Gatineau, winning Gold in the All Arounds with a score of 55.400. In the Event Finals, she won Gold on Vault and Floor as well as Silver on Bars. She had the highest score on Vault 15.050 and Floor 14.2 of all Juniors and Seniors both days combined.
Megan also won the Juniors Qualification round with 1st place on Bars, Vault and Floor. As well, she was chosen as the Junior High Performance athlete of the year and received an award for earning Medals for Canada in International events.

In September, Roberts competed at the Japan Junior International. She won Silver on Floor in the event finals.

Senior career

2016 

Roberts made her Senior debut in January at Elite Canada in Halifax Nova Scotia. She won Silver in the All-Arounds and Bronze on floor in the Event Finals. In April, she competed at the 2016 Pacific Rim Gymnastics Championships, winning team silver and placing fifth on balance beam and sixth on floor exercise in the event finals. In June, Megan competed at the 2016 Canadian Gymnastics Championships in Edmonton. In the qualification round, she placed 4th with a score of 55.200 and in the All Around/Event Finals she placed  5th with a score of 54.950. She won the Bronze on Bars and placed 4th on Beam.

At the beginning of July, she competed at the Rio Olympic selection camp in Gatineau, Que. She came in 3rd (54.717) on Day 1 and 5th (54.250) on Day 2. She was named 1st alternate to the team. In August, she travelled with the Olympic team to Rio for the 2016 Summer Olympics.

2017 

In February, Roberts competed at Elite Canada, she placed 4th in the all-arounds and won Gold on floor and 4th on beam in the Event Finals.

2018 

In February, Roberts competed at Elite Canada, she placed 8th in the all-arounds.

In May, Roberts competed at The Canadian National Championships, she placed 13th in the two day combined all-arounds.

In September, Roberts started her NCAA career with the Georgia Gym Dogs.

Competitive History

References

External links 
 Gymnastics Canada - Megan Roberts

2000 births
Living people
Canadian female artistic gymnasts
Georgia Gym Dogs gymnasts
Gymnasts from Toronto
21st-century Canadian women